Data-Pop Alliance is a non-profit think tank founded by the Harvard Humanitarian Initiative, MIT Media Lab and the Overseas Development Institute. Emmanuel Letouzé is Director and Co-Founder and Alex Pentland is Academic Director. Its research areas includes public policy, inequality, privacy, crime, climate change and human rights.

Data-Pop Alliance is a partner for the United Nations Global Partnership for Sustainable Development Data and the Sustainable Development Learning & Training Course Partnerships. In addition, it is a partner of the United Nations System Staff College in the context of Agenda 2030.

References 

Think tanks based in the United States